Country Squire Airpark  is a public airport located three miles (4.8 km) south of Sandy in Clackamas County, Oregon, United States.

External links

Airports in Clackamas County, Oregon